The 1908 World Greco-Roman Wrestling Championship were held in Vienna, Cisleithania, Austria-Hungary on 8 December 1908.

Medal table

Medal summary

Men's Greco-Roman

References
UWW Database

World Wrestling Championships
W
W
W